2 Good 2 B True is American teen pop singer Aaron Carter's third and final compilation album. The album primarily consists of songs that originally appeared on Aaron Carter's last three studio albums. It was released in February 2006, only one month after his previous compilation Come Get It: The Very Best of Aaron Carter.

Track listing

Track information
Tracks 1–4 can be found on 2000's Aaron's Party (Come Get It).
Track 3 can be found on 2000s The Little Vampire soundtrack.
Track 6 can be found on 2001's Oh Aaron.
Tracks 8–10 can be found on 2002's Another Earthquake.
Tracks 5 and 7 are B-sides to singles released from the album Aaron's Party (Come Get It).

References

Aaron Carter compilation albums
2006 compilation albums
Sony BMG compilation albums